Smörgåskaviar ('sandwich caviar') is a fish roe spread eaten in Scandinavia and Finland. Despite its name, smörgåskaviar is not actual caviar, i.e. sturgeon roe.  Instead, it is a paste made from cod roe and a variable mix of other ingredients, which can include potato flakes, tomato sauce, onion, salt and sometimes dill or chives. It is usually sold in smoked and non-smoked variants, as well as in variants with a prominent taste of dill.

See also

 Kalles Kaviar, a brand of smörgåskaviar
 List of smoked foods

References

Swedish cuisine
Finnish cuisine
Smoked fish
Condiments
Roe dishes

sv:Smörgåskaviar